Colton School District may refer to:

Colton Joint Unified School District, California, United States
Colton School District, Colton, Oregon
Colton School District, rural school districts in Washington state, United States